The Confederation of State Employees' Unions (Pardia) was a trade union in Finland. The majority of Pardia's 60,000 members worked in governmental offices and institutions, while others were employed by public utility companies and enterprises. Approximately 50 percent of all Finnish state employees were members of Pardia.

In 1990, the Finnish Police Union, the Union of Civil Servants, and the Union of Finnish Employees, all affiliates of the Confederation of Salaried Employees (TVK), formed TVK-State, as an umbrella organisation.  The TVK went bankrupt in 1992, and TVK-State was dissolved, and replaced by a new, independent, organisation, the Confederation of State Employees' Organisations (VHKL).  In 1993, the unions joined the Finnish Confederation of Salaried Employees (STTK), and founded the "Confederation of State Employees' Unions".  In 2000, it adopted the short name of Pardia.  The Finnish Police Union disaffiliated in 2016.

At the start of 2019, Pardia merged into Trade Union Pro.

References

External links
https://web.archive.org/web/20130530140335/http://www.pardia.fi/in_english/

Finnish Confederation of Professionals
Trade unions in Finland
Trade unions established in 1993
Trade unions disestablished in 2019